Detention may refer to:

Types of detention
 Detention (imprisonment), imprisonment of someone guilty or suspected of a crime 
 Detention basin, an artificial flow control structure that is used to contain flood water for a limited period of time
 Immigration detention, imprisonment of an unauthorised person entering a country
 Preventive detention, detention intended to prevent criminal acts
 Remand (detention), the keeping in custody of an arrested person awaiting adjudication
 School detention, a form of punishment used in schools

Film and television
 Detention (2003 film), an American action film directed by Sidney J. Furie
 Detention (2010 film), an American horror film starring Preston Jones and David Carradine
 Detention (2011 film), an American horror film directed by Joseph Kahn and starring Josh Hutcherson
 Detention (2019 film), a Taiwanese horror film set during the White Terror, based on the video game of the same name
 Detention (American TV series), a 1999–2000 American animated TV series
 Detention (Taiwanese TV series), a 2020 Taiwanese TV series based on the video game
 "Detention" (Cold Case episode), an episode of the television series Cold Case

Other uses
 Detention (video game), a Taiwanese horror game set during the White Terror
 "Detention", a song by Melanie Martinez from her 2019 album K-12
 Detention, Tasmania, a locality in Australia

See also 
 
 
 Custody (disambiguation)
 Detention center (disambiguation)
 Detonation (disambiguation)
 Involuntary commitment
 Prison